Augustus is a 1986 historical novel by Scottish writer Allan Massie, the first of a highly regarded series of novels about the movers and makers of Imperial Rome. Massie begins with Augustus, the successor to Julius Caesar, who ruled the Roman Empire for forty one years and oversaw the beginnings of an extended peace, the Pax Romana.

Synopsis
The novel is in the form of a memoir written by Augustus in old age, in which he looks back over his long reign. Massie uses modern language and phraseology to describe Augustus' ruthlessness and the political intrigue he mastered and used so capably to keep himself in power for so many years when for most of his rule he was surrounded by powerful enemies and duplicitous allies.

References

1986 British novels
Fictional depictions of Augustus in literature
British historical novels
Novels set in ancient Rome
The Bodley Head books